Hallucis muscle may refer to:

 Abductor hallucis muscle
 Adductor hallucis muscle
 Extensor hallucis longus muscle
 Extensor hallucis brevis muscle
 Flexor hallucis brevis muscle
 Flexor hallucis longus muscle